"Great Dreams of Heaven" is the first solo single released by Ian McNabb after disbanding the Icicle Works. It was first released in 1991, then re-released in 1993 from the album Truth and Beauty.

Track listings
1991 release
7"
 "Great Dreams of Heaven" 
 "That's Why I Believe"

CD [Germany] & 12"
 "Great Dreams of Heaven" (5:10)
 "That's Why I Believe" (5:29)
 "Make Love to You" (4:43)
 "Power of Song" (4:02)

1993 release
7" & cassette
 "Great Dreams of Heaven" (5:07)
 "Unknown Legend" (3:55)
12"
 "Great Dreams of Heaven" (5:07)
 "Unknown Legend" (3:35)
 "I'm Game" (4:25)
 "Caroline No" (3:05)
CD
 "Great Dreams of Heaven (Version)" (3:55)
 "Unknown Legend" (3:35)
 "I'm Game" (4:25)
 "Caroline No" (3:05)
CD [France]
 "Great Dreams of Heaven (Version)" (3:55)
 "Unknown Legend" (3:35)

Music video
The accompanying music video showed, amongst other things, McNabb singing into a telephone receiver.

References

1991 debut singles
1993 singles
Ian McNabb songs
1991 songs